56 Rue Pigalle is a 1949 French crime drama film directed by Willy Rozier and starring Jacques Dumesnil, Marie Déa and Aimé Clariond. It has been classified as a film noir. It was shot at the Victorine Studios and on location around Nice.

Synopsis
Jean Vigneron, a famous yachtsmen, is in love with Inès the wife of his best friend. They are blackmailed due to incriminating letters being stolen by a valet living in the Rue Pigalle. When he is found murdered suspicion inevitably points at Vigneron. He flees to the French Congo, until he is absolved by a surprise witness.

Cast
 Jacques Dumesnil as 	Jean Vigneron
 Marie Déa as 	Inès de Montalban
 Aimé Clariond as 	Ricardo de Montalban
 Raymond Cordy as Le chauffeur de taxi
 Janine Miller as Nadia, la chanteuse
 René Blancard as 	Lucien Bonnet
 Jean Geoffroy as	Baruch 
 Marco Villa as Fred Poulain
 Denyse Roux as Janis
 Lucien Callamand as Le procureur

References

Bibliography
 Spicer, Andrew. European Film Noir. Manchester University Press, 2019.

External links 
 

1949 films
1940s French-language films
1949 drama films
1949 crime drama films
French crime drama films
Films directed by Willy Rozier
Films shot at Victorine Studios
Films shot in Nice
Films set in Nice
1940s French films